Felice Orlandi (18 September 1925 – 21 May 2003) was an Italian-born American actor, known for roles in films such as The Pusher (1960), Bullitt (1968), Catch-22 (1970) and The Driver (1978). He also appeared in numerous TV series during the 1960s-1980s, including Gunsmoke, Mannix, Hogan's Heroes, Hawaii Five-O and Hill Street Blues.

A native of Avezzano in Italy, he was raised in Cleveland, and earned a theater arts degree at Carnegie Tech (now Carnegie Mellon University). He made his Broadway debut in 1954 in The Girl on the Via Flaminia. He was married to actress Alice Ghostley for 50 years.

Orlandi died of lung cancer in Burbank, California, at age 77. He is buried in part of the Ghostley family plot at Oak Hill Cemetery in Siloam Springs, Arkansas. Upon her death in 2007, his wife Alice, was buried beside Alice's sister, Gladys and their parents are also interred here.

Filmography

References

External links
 

20th-century American male actors
American male stage actors
American male film actors
American male television actors
1925 births
2003 deaths
Place of birth missing
People from Avezzano
American people of Italian descent